Gothic Harvest is a 2019 erotic horror film shot in the French Quarter of New Orleans, Louisiana. It was directed by Ashley Hamilton, who also starred alongside Lin Shaye and Bill Mosley.

Synopsis 
The film follows the aristocratic, wealthy French Boudine family, who move to New Orleans in the mid-1800s to make their way in America, only to have their beautiful youngest daughter cross paths with the fiancé of the legendary Queen of Louisiana Voodoo, Marie Laveau. Their interlude results in a baby, which causes the entire family to become the focus of Laveau's most destructive curse.

Cast
 Lin Shaye
 Bill Moseley
 Ashley Hamilton
 Sofia Mattsson
 Ashton Leigh
 Tanyell Q. Waivers 
 Yohance Myles
 Michelle West
 Ciara Rizzo
 Ashton Mcclearin
 Abbie Gayle
 Mary Alice Risener
 Alex Biglae
 Carol Sutton
 David Kallaway
 Janee Michelle
 Gigi Zumbado
 Lashekia Armand

Reception 
The Los Angeles Times and Eye for Film were both critical of the movie, with the former stating "Most of this film consists of tedious scenes of partying and violence, with much of the latter being unpleasantly sexualized. Flashbacks and monologues attempt to explain the story’s roots in an ancient feud between vampires and voodoo priestesses, but no amount of lore — or bayou seasoning — can enrich this dull, derivative monster movie." WickedHorror questioned the presence of Lin Shaye and Bill Moseley in the movie, writing that "there’s a sense both Moseley and Shaye are above this kind of material, even if their presence makes the film significantly more palatable. None of the other performers makes an impression, save for the lady playing Laveau who gives it socks in her brief scene (take that, Ryan Murphy)."

References

External links
 

2019 films
American supernatural horror films
Films directed by Ashley Hamilton
American erotic horror films
2019 horror films
2010s English-language films
2010s American films